Veríssimo Correia Seabra (February 16, 1947 – October 6, 2004) was a Bissau-Guinean general, known for leading a coup that deposed Kumba Ialá on September 14, 2003.

Early life
Correia Seabra was born in the capital city, Bissau, on  February 16, 1947. He belonged to the Papel minority.

In 1963, at the age of 16, Correia Seabra joined the African Party for the Independence of Guinea and Cape Verde (PAIGC) as a guerilla fighting against Portuguese colonial rule. Three years later, he was sent to study electronic engineering in Bulgaria. In 1971, he attended an artillery school in the Soviet Union. On his return to the bush war in Guinea-Bissau, he was out in charge of an artillery unit near the southern border with Guinea. In 1976, he was sent to Portugal for officer training.

Career
In the years following independence, Correia Seabra played a key role in the internal politics of the PAIGC. He participated in the 1980 military coup that overthrew President Luís Cabral. Promoted steadily through the ranks, he became deputy head of the Guinea-Bissau military contingent of the United Nations mission in Angola from 1991 to 1992. He was then appointed head of operations in military high command two years later.

Conflict
Correia Seabra joined General Ansumane Mané in the 1998 uprising against President João Bernardo Vieira. The nation descended into a brief, but bloody civil war. He was again involved in a May 1999 military coup that forced President Vieira from power. Soon thereafter, he became chief of staff of the armed forces and was appointed Minister of Defense in the government named on February 19, 2000, under President Kumba Ialá. In November 2000, Mané attempted to replace Correia Seabra as chief of staff and placed him under house arrest, but Correia Seabra escaped and fighting erupted; Mané was killed in a clash with government forces a week later. Correia Seabra remained in his position.

Soldier payment controversy
As Ialá’s behavior became more erratic and the government failed to pay several months of wages owed to soldiers, he warned the President that the military would be forced to intervene again unless salaries were paid. Correia Seabra led the bloodless coup that ousted Kumba Ialá from power on September 14, 2003. It was welcomed by most Guineans while provoking condemnation from the international community. His first act as head of the 32-member Military Committee for the Restoration of Constitutional and Democratic Order was to convene a meeting of political, religious, and civil society leaders to choose a new civilian-led government that would be charged with organizing elections.

Henrique Rosa was nominated to head the caretaker government and became president on September 28, 2003. Seabra continued to serve as chairman of the National Transition Council. Free and fair parliamentary elections were held on March 28, 2004.

Death
On October 6, 2004, a mutiny by soldiers over unpaid salaries turned violent. Veríssimo Correia Seabra along with an aide, Lieutenant Colonel Domingos Barros, were detained and beaten to death by revolting soldiers.

The Portuguese president, Jorge Sampaio, also called for the restoration of legality in Guinea-Bissau, after learning of the death of Veríssimo Seabra.

References

1947 births
2004 deaths
People from Bissau
Bissau-Guinean military personnel
Presidents of Guinea-Bissau
People murdered in Guinea-Bissau
Bissau-Guinean murder victims
2004 murders in Africa
Assassinated Bissau-Guinean politicians
African Party for the Independence of Guinea and Cape Verde politicians